Mehdi Zamani (born 20 December 1989) is an Iranian track and field sprinter who specialises in the 400 metres, who was banned for two years for doping.

Career
He started out as an 800 metres runner. He placed sixth in that event at the 2010 Asian Indoor Athletics Championships, held in Tehran, and anchored the 4×400 metres relay team to the gold medal (his first international podium finish).

He was banned from competition for two years from June 2011 to 2013 after a positive doping test for the banned steroid methandienone.

He returned to action in 2013 as a sprint specialist and after the expiry of his doping ban helped break the Iranian record of 39.69 seconds for the 4×100 metres relay, running alongside Reza Ghasemi, Ali Reza Habibi, and Hassan Taftian. At the 2014 Asian Indoor Athletics Championships, he won the individual 400 metres gold medal after setting a personal best of 47.62 seconds to win at the Iranian Championships.

See also
List of doping cases in athletics

References

External links

Living people
1989 births
Iranian male sprinters
Doping cases in athletics
Iranian sportspeople in doping cases
Athletes (track and field) at the 2014 Asian Games
Asian Games competitors for Iran
21st-century Iranian people